Statistics of the 1990–91 Saudi First Division.

External links 
 Saudi Arabia Football Federation
 Saudi League Statistics
 Al Jazirah 28 May 1991 issue 6816 

Saudi First Division League seasons
Saudi Professional League
2